A Blonde for a Night is a 1928 American silent comedy film directed by E. Mason Hopper and F. McGrew Willis and starring Marie Prevost, Franklin Pangborn and Harrison Ford.

The film's sets were designed by the art director Stephen Goosson.

Premise
After an argument with her husband on their honeymoon in Paris, a wife disguises herself as a blonde woman to test her husband's fidelity.

Cast
 Marie Prevost as Marcia Webster  
 Franklin Pangborn as Hector  
 Harrison Ford as Bob Webster  
 T. Roy Barnes as George Mason  
 Lucien Littlefield as Jenks

References

Bibliography
 Munden, Kenneth White. The American Film Institute Catalog of Motion Pictures Produced in the United States, Part 1. University of California Press, 1997.

External links

1928 films
1928 comedy films
Silent American comedy films
Films directed by E. Mason Hopper
American silent feature films
1920s English-language films
Films set in Paris
American black-and-white films
Pathé Exchange films
1920s American films